La Martyre (Ar Merzer in Breton) is a commune in the Finistère department of Brittany in northwestern France.

Population
Inhabitants of La Martyre are called in French Martyriens.

Sights
The village of La Martyre has one of the oldest parish palisades (fr), whose construction was undertaken between the 11th and 17th centuries.

History
The village owes its name to the assassination on 25 June 874 of King Salomon of Brittany, who had sought refuge in the village church. The church was called "la Martyre" (Ar Merzher, the Martyr) after its desecration, and the name was taken up by the village. As for the king, he was canonised in 910 for his martyrdom and his virtues.

In the Middle Ages, a prestigious tulle fair took place in La Martyre. In the 15th and 16th centuries this fair saw the most activity. Legend has it that the father of William Shakespeare used to frequent these fairs, which no longer take place.

See also
Communes of the Finistère department
List of the works of the Maître de Plougastel
La Martyre Parish close
List of works of the two Folgoët ateliers

References

External links
Official website 

Communes of Finistère